Okuma Bay is a bay located at 77° 50'  S  158° 20'  W on the  Ross Ice Shelf of Antarctica at its juncture with Edward VII Peninsula.

It was discovered by the British National Antarctic Expedition (or Discovery Expedition) under Robert Falcon Scott in 1902.  Named by the Japanese Antarctic Expedition led by Lt. Nobu Shirase (1911–12) after Count Shigenobu Okuma (1838–1922), the Premier of Japan.

Bays of the Ross Dependency
King Edward VII Land